(born 1974) is a Nigerian author and social media influencer.

Omokri was the host of Transformation with Reno Omokri, a Christian teaching TV show broadcast (for one season) on San Francisco's KTLN-TV and Detroit's Impact Network.

Career 
Omokri is a Vice President of Joe Trippi and Associates, a U.S. political consulting firm.

As the Special Assistant to President Goodluck Jonathan, he was noted for using social media to conduct surveys and draw attention to the projects of the Nigerian Government.

In 2011, Omokri called for Nigerians living outside Nigeria, to endorse Jonathan for the 2011 elections. Omokri was a signatory of a letter by a group known as G 57 that called for the resignation of Yar'adua.

Between 2015 and 2016, Omokri was the host of Transformations With Reno Omokri, a Christian teaching program broadcast on Comcast, DISH Network and Roku. The 30 minute weekly telecast was produced by the Mind of Christ Christian Center in California.

Since 29 May 2015, Omokri has continued to be opposed to policies of the current Nigerian government, and has  had conflicts with the Nigerian authorities. He has also been a noted conservative, calling for a restoration of the moral fabric of society.

Controversy 

On Tuesday, 12 October 2021, a female gubernatorial candidate for Kogi State, Natasha H. Akpoti alleged that Omokri had propositioned her on 6 May 2014, during a state banquet for Kenyan President Uhuru Kenyatta.

In response, Omokri announced a $50,000 reward for anyone who could provide a photograph or video of him at the Uhuru Kenyatta banquet, and provided evidence in the form of a British Airways ticket, and Nigerian and American immigration stamps on his passport that proved he was not in the country during the said event. Natasha Akpoti, who accused him then deleted all traces of her accusation from her social media profiles.

Advocacy

Buses for Democracy 
During Nigeria's 2019 general elections, the Independent National Electoral Commission postponed the election previously scheduled to hold on Saturday 16 February 2019 by a week. As the election postponement was announced only 5 hours before the polls were to open, Nigerians were angry since many travelled long distances to vote, only to be frustrated. As a result of their frustrations, Omokri initiated a program he tagged #BusesForDemocracy, which provided free transportation to voters to their polling unit irrespective of who they intended to vote for.

Free Leah Sharibu movement 
Omokri is the founder of the Free Leah Sharibu movement, a media campaign advocating for the freedom of Leah Sharibu, a Christian girl who was kidnapped by the radical Islamic sect, Boko Haram, on February 19, 2018. Boko Haram offered to release Sharibu if she would convert to Islam, but she refused to do this.

On April 3, 2019, former British Foreign Secretary, Boris Johnson MP, unveiled the #FreeLeahSharibu customised clothing line at his office at the British Parliament. Through the clothing line and his book, Omokri raised over £4,000 for Miss Sharibu's parents.

On April 11, 2019, Omokri wore the customised #FreeLeahSharibu tracksuit over Mount Everest in Nepal.

On Saturday, November 2, 2019, Omokri was honoured with the Humanitarian of the Year award at the Hollywood Weekly Magazine Film Festival, at Warner Brothers Studio in Burbank, California, for his work on the #FreeLeahSharibu campaign.

On Wednesday, February 16, 2022, Omokri collaborated with Onyeka Onwenu, Panam Percy Paul, and Leah's Father for a Charity Single for Leah Sharibu to mark the 4th anniversary of her abduction by Boko Haram/ISWAP.

The song, Angels on Guard: A Song for Leah, executive produced by Omokri, charted worldwide and was on rotation on radio stations.

#ENDSARS 

Reno Omokri successfully supported a campaign to unfollow Nigeria's president, Muhammadu Buhari on Twitter. His campaign #UnfollowBuhari, led to a 100,000 drop in the Nigerian President's Twitter following in just 3 hours.

#HarassBuhariOutofLondon 
On April 2, 2021, Omokri led a series of protests in London to force General Buhari to return to Nigeria, instead of relying on the UK for healthcare. Mr Buhari had flown into London the previous day.

#HarassBuhariOutofNewYork 

On Friday, September 24, 2021, Omokri led a protest against Nigeria's President Buhari in New York, where the latter was attending the Seventy-sixth session of the United Nations General Assembly.

The New York Police Department were called on protesters by the Nigerian Consulate, but no arrest or intervention was made, as the protest was peaceful.

However, after the protest, Mr. Omokri was trailed to his hotel by an assailant and attacked. He was only saved by his bodyguard, Mr. Sean Reilly, who wrestled the assailant, chased him away and called the police. The whole incident was caught on tape and covered by the media.

The next day (Saturday, September 25, 2021), a pro-Buhari group issued a statement carried by the government leaning Daily Times, warning Mr. Omokri to expect more "deadly" attacks.

#BuhariForPrison2023 

On Wednesday, November 17, 2021, Omokri initiated a petition on the change.org platform for the International Criminal court to prosecute and jail Nigerian President Muhammadu Buhari for the #LekkiMassacre of peaceful, unarmed #EndSARS protesters, after the Lagos #EndSARS panel indicted the Buhari administration in its report.

In under 24 hours, 40,000 people had signed the petition, and by Friday, November 19, 2021, it had become the fastest signed petition of Nigerian origin, according to Nigeria's largest selling daily newspaper, The Punch.

Awards 
In April 2022, Omokri received the Business Influencer of the Year award in the Business Insider Africa awards from Business Insider, an American financial and business news website, after securing 74.67% of over 200,000 votes. He was congratulated by former Nigerian President Goodluck Jonathan, and former Vice President Atiku Abubakar.

Publications
Poverty Is A Choice
Shunpiking: No Shortcuts to God. Deep River Books, 2013. .
Why Jesus Wept. RevMedia, 2015. .
Apples of Gold (a book of Godly wisdom). Mind of Christ Christian Center, 2017. .
Facts Versus Fiction: The True Story of the Jonathan Years, Chibok, 2015 and the Conspiracies. Mind of Christ Christian Center, 2017.

References

External links

Build Up Nigeria

Living people
End SARS activists
Nigerian expatriates in the United States
Alumni of the University of Wolverhampton
1974 births
Nigerian Christians
Nigerian critics
Jonathan administration personnel